Steve Pleau (born February 11, 1973) is an American ice hockey coach. He is currently employed by the Calgary Flames of the National Hockey League (NHL) as a professional scout.

Pleau was an assistant head coach with the Worcester IceCats of the American Hockey League (AHL) from 1998 to 2005. On June 16, 2005, he was named the head coach of the Peoria Rivermen for the 2005–06 AHL season, replacing Don Granato who was receiving treatment for cancer. Pleau was named the head coach for the Edmonton Oil Kings of the Western Hockey League (WHL) on June 22, 2007, remaining in that position until 2010.

Family
Steve Pleau is the son of the former Montreal Canadiens' centre Larry Pleau.

References

External links

1973 births
Living people
American ice hockey coaches
American men's ice hockey forwards
Calgary Flames scouts
Edmonton Oil Kings coaches
New Hampshire Wildcats men's ice hockey players
People from Seabrook, New Hampshire
Sportspeople from Rockingham County, New Hampshire